The 1987 Kvalserien was the 13th edition of the Kvalserien. It determined which two teams of the participating ones would play in the 1987–88 Elitserien season and which two teams would play in the 1987–88 Swedish Division 1 season.

Tournament

External links
Tournament on hockeyarchives.info

Kvalserien
Kval